The 2021–22 Iraq Division One was the 48th season of the Iraq Division One, the second tier of the Iraqi football league system since its establishment in 1974. The number of clubs in the league have varied throughout history for various reasons; in this season the number of clubs has been reduced from 28 teams to 24. The top two teams are directly promoted to the Iraqi Premier League, while the bottom 4 teams in each group are directly relegated to the Iraq Division Two. The season started on 12 October 2021 and ended 19 April 2022, while the summer transfer window began on August 1 and ended on midnight on September 19.

Al-Hudood won the title by beating Karbalaa 1–0 in the final at Al-Shaab Stadium, with both teams securing promotion.

Overview

Changes 
In November 2020, The Iraq FA announced that the number of teams will decrease from 28 to 24 in total starting from 2021-2022 season. To make these changes possible, the Iraq FA announced that in 2020–21 season, The top teams in each group are directly promoted to the Premier League, while 8 teams in total are directly relegated to Division Two.

Teams 
A total of 24 teams are contesting the league, including 21 sides from the 2020-2021 season and the 3 relegated sides from the Iraqi Premier League. There are no promoted teams participating in this season because of the recent changes necessary to adjustment to having 24 teams possible this season.

2021–22 season

League table

Group 1

Results

Group 2

Results

Third place

Final

Play-off

References

External links
 Iraq Football Association

Iraq Division One seasons
2021–22 in Iraqi football